The 2023 ICC Cricket World Cup will be the 13th edition of the Cricket World Cup, a quadrennial One Day International (ODI) cricket tournament contested by men's national teams and organized by the International Cricket Council (ICC). It is scheduled to be hosted by India during October and November 2023, and will be the first time the competition is held entirely in India. Three previous editions were partially hosted there – 1987, 1996, and 2011. Originally, the tournament was scheduled to be played from 9 February to 26 March 2023; but in July 2020, it was announced that the tournament would be delayed to an October–November window, following the disruption of the qualification schedule due to the COVID-19 pandemic.  

England are the defending champions, having won the previous edition in 2019.

Qualification

As with the previous edition, the tournament will feature ten teams. The main route for qualification will be the 2020–2023 ICC Cricket World Cup Super League tournament.

For the World Cup, the top seven sides plus the hosts (India) from the thirteen competitors in the Super League will qualify. The remaining five teams, along with five Associate sides, will play in the 2023 Cricket World Cup Qualifier, from which two teams will go through to the final tournament.

League Stage

Knockout Stage

Semi-finals

Final

References 

 
2023 in Indian sport
World Cup
2023
Cricket World Cup
World Cup, 2023
World Cup, 2023